The Yamaha PortaSound PC-50 is an entry-level portable musical keyboard produced by the Yamaha Corporation in 1983.

Specifications
44 keys
6 voice polyphony: organ, violin, clarinet, piano, harpsichord, and vibraphone
6 rhythm patterns: march, waltz, slow rock, jazz rock, swing, rumba
Power source: 9VDC by six "C" size batteries or external
Output ports: 3.5mm headphone jack, aux RCA connector, and expression pedal.
Input port: power in: 9-12VDC

External links
 Yamaha PC-50 Owner's Guide at manufacturer's site
 Yamaha history of electronic music instruments

PC-50